The Dewar Cup Edinburgh  was an indoor men's and women's tennis event held from 1968 to 1972, and played in Edinburgh, Scotland as part of the second leg of Dewar Cup Circuit of indoor tournaments held throughout the United Kingdom.

History
The Dewar Cup Edinburgh was a men's  women's professional tennis tournament, held from 1968 to 1974 in Edinburgh, Scotland. The tournament was not part of the Women's Tennis Association (WTA) Tour, but is listed, albeit as a non-tour event, in the WTA's Tour's history section. However it was part of the International Tennis Federations independent tournaments tour. Virginia Wade, later a Wimbledon champion, was the only Briton to win a title at the tournament, and was also the event's most successful player, with two wins in the singles and doubles.

Finals

Mens singles

Women's singles

Doubles

References

Sources
 Nieuwland, Alex. "Dewar Cup Second Leg 1972 - Edinburgh". www.tennisarchives.com. Tennis Archives. 
 Nieuwland, Alex. "Dewar Cup Second Leg 1973 - Edinburgh". www.tennisarchives.com. Netherlands: Tennis Archives.  
 Nieuwland, Alex. "Dewar Cup Second Leg 1974 - Edinburgh". www.tennisarchives.com. Netherlands: Tennis Archives. 
 Sony Ericsson WTA Tour: Events 1968-2007" (PDF). web.archive.org. Wayback Machine. 29 May 2008.

Grass court tennis tournaments
Clay court tennis tournaments
Tennis tournaments in Scotland
Indoor tennis tournaments
International sports competitions in Edinburgh
WTA Tour
Recurring sporting events established in 1971
1970s in Edinburgh
1977 disestablishments in Scotland
Defunct tennis tournaments in the United Kingdom
1971 establishments in Scotland
Recurring sporting events disestablished in 1977